On April 25, 2014, a localized tornado outbreak struck North Carolina, resulting in the first tornado-related fatality during that year in the United States. The event marked the latest formation of the first EF3 or stronger tornado during a calendar year and latest date for the first tornadic death. 

Throughout North Carolina, the tornadoes killed 1 person and injured 27 others. A total of 327 homes were damaged or destroyed across four counties, with 60% of these being in Beaufort County.

Meteorological synopsis

Preceding severe weather event (April 22–24)
On April 20, meteorologists at the Storm Prediction Center noted that a significant change in the large-scale synoptic pattern across the United States would allow for a trough to move inland over the Northwestern United States. They noted the possibility of isolated severe thunderstorms across the Rocky Mountain Foothills. This system moved into the region two days later and prompted the issuance of a slight-risk around the Yellowstone National Park region in Idaho, Montana, and Wyoming. Ahead of the trough, upper-level cooling above modest surface heating enhanced low-level lapse rates and allowed for scattered severe storms. A severe thunderstorm watch was issued for the region by 2:30 p.m. MDT (2030 UTC) as a cold front associated with the trough moved through. Straight-line winds up to  occurred in the area. Across Idaho, approximately 1,600 Rocky Mountain Power customers lost electricity due to the storms. A two vehicle accident near Fredregill was also blamed on the system.

On April 23, the system continued steadily eastward across the Central United States. Daytime heating ahead of the system fueled instability that later fed widespread severe activity that extended from Texas to Nebraska. Convective available potential energy (CAPE) values across the area averaged 1,000 J/kg in Kansas and peaked near 2,000 J/kg in Texas. In contrast to the risk of supercells capable of producing very large hail, only two reports of  diameter hail were received that day. In some places, hail from the storms lasted more than 10 minutes and accumulated on the ground. Hurricane-force winds were reported with a few of the cells, namely near Rocky, Oklahoma where gusts reached  in a downburst. In Ripley, Oklahoma, straight-line winds tore a metal roof off a home and damaged a few others.

By April 24, the system had transformed into a shortwave trough over the Central Plains with a cold front extending southward to the Gulf of Mexico. Several area of low pressure were excepted to form along this front and propagate northward, congealing into a single system later that day. Ahead of the front, weak, elevated thunderstorms formed; however, a second line closer to the front became better defined during the day due to enhanced moisture. There was initially some question as to the intensity these storms would achieve due to the preceding line limiting daytime heating.

Tornado outbreak
In advance of a compact shortwave trough and associated cold front, numerous severe thunderstorms developed across central and eastern North Carolina into southern Virginia. An EF3 tornado tracked through the Whichards Beach area, damaging or destroying 100 homes, and injuring 16 people. A separate circulation produced a series of damaging tornadoes near Elizabeth City, including two EF2s, one of which resulted in a fatality. This event marks the latest time of formation of the first EF3+ tornado in any year on record.

Straight-line winds estimated at  destroyed an outbuilding and part of a barn near Louisberg in Franklin County.

Confirmed tornadoes

April 25 event

Aftermath
In the wake of the tornadoes, North Carolina Governor Pat McCrory declared a state of emergency for Beaufort, Perquimans, Chowan and Pasquotank Counties. He subsequently made a request for federal disaster aid to the Federal Emergency Management Agency (FEMA) on May 2. Two public shelters were opened in Beaufort County. On May 9, FEMA formally denied McCrory's request, stating that the scale of damage was not severe enough to warrant assistance. Though McCrory could have appealed to President Barack Obama, he opted not to and placed priority on providing affected residents with immediate aid. On May 14, local disaster aid in conjunction with the Small Business Administration was approved for residents in Beaufort, Pasquotank, and Perquimans Counties.

See also

 List of tornadoes and tornado outbreaks
 Tornadoes of 2014
 Tornado outbreak of April 27–30, 2014 – A deadly tornado outbreak that occurred just two days later across much of the Central and Eastern United States

Notes

References

2014 in North Carolina
F3 tornadoes
Tornadoes of 2014
Tornadoes in North Carolina
April 2014 events in the United States
2014 natural disasters in the United States